Rashidah Sa'adatul Bolkiah (born 26 July 1969) is the eldest daughter of Sultan Hassanal Bolkiah and Queen Saleha.

Education and early life 
Princess Rashidah attended Puteri-Putera School, Jerudong International School and graduated Universiti Brunei Darussalam (UBD) with a Master's degree in Public Policy and Administration. She worked in the Public Service Department of the Prime Minister's Office in 1994, and the Ministry of Development in 1995.

Marriage and children

Marriage 
The marriage of Princess Rashidah and her will-be husband, Pengiran Maharaja Setia Laila Diraja Shahibul Irshad Pengiran Anak Haji 'Abdul Rahim, was broadcast to the public via Radio Television Brunei (RTB), and the cerebration followed the Malay Muslim Monarchy philosophy. The Majlis Istiadat Bersuruh Diraja held at Istana Nurul Iman on 9 August 1996. Prior to the wedding, rumors have been circulating around the population of Brunei. The Gendang Jaga-Jaga began with court musicians playing traditional music instruments, followed by a 21-gun salute at the Lapau. After that, the Menerima Tanda Diraja was carried out on 12 August. 

Then on the Afternoon of 13 August, the Menerima Pertunangan Diraja began. That following day, the Berbedak Ceremony was carried out, and at Omar Ali Saifuddien Mosque, Akad Nikah unites both the bride and groom on 15 August. After several days of ceremonies, Bersanding was carried out in the Throne Hall of the Istana Nurul Iman with the presence of the Royal family, both local and foreign 5,000 guests on 18 August.

Children 
Princess Rashidah and Prince 'Abdul Rahim have 2 sons and 3 daughters. The order by age is as follows;

 Princess Raheemah Sanaul Bolkiah (born 28 December 1997)
 Princess Hariisah Widadul Bolqiah
 Prince 'Abdul Raqiib (14 May 2002)
 Prince 'Abdul Haseeb (14 January 2006)
 Princess Raqeeqah Raayatul Bolqiah (16 December 2009)

Personal interests 
Princess Rashidah enjoys playing badminton and bowling.

She is the current President of Girl Guides Association of Brunei Darussalam (PPPBD). During the World Thinking Day 2014 celebration, she mentioned the improvement of the educational attainment level among the PPPBD members who are still in school, and to enhance their ability to pursue higher education.

Honours

Namesakes 

 Pengiran Anak Puteri Hajah Rashidah Sa'adatul Bolkiah Secondary School, a government secondary school in Lumut.
 Pengiran Anak Puteri Rashidah Sa'adatul Bolkiah Religious School, a religious school in Seria.
 Pengiran Anak Puteri Rashidah Sa'adatul Bolkiah Institute of Health Sciences, a health institute in Universiti Brunei Darussalam.
 Pengiran Anak Puteri Rashidah Sa'adatul Bolkiah Health Centre, a health centre in Sungai Asam, Lumapas.
 Rashidah Sa'adatul Bolkiah Mosque, a mosque in Sungai Akar, Bandar Seri Begawan.
 Princess Rashidah Young Nature Scientist Award (PRYNSA), a prestigious and high profile awareness programme.

Honours

National 

  Order of the Crown of Brunei (DKMB) – (15 August 1982)
  Sultan of Brunei Golden Jubilee Medal (5 October 2017)
  Sultan Hassanal Bolkiah Medal First Class (PHBS) 
  Proclamation of Independence Medal – (1 January 1984) 
  Silver Jubilee Medal – (5 October 1992)

Foreign 
:
  Grand Cordon Supreme Order of the Renaissance – (13 May 2008)

References

Living people 
Bruneian royalty
1969 births
Bruneian women
Daughters of monarchs
Universiti Brunei Darussalam alumni